FCCF may refer to:
 Finnish Correspondence Chess Federation
 Fédération culturelle canadienne-française, see French Canadian
 Flow cytometry core facility (used in many universities)